Aroga balcanicola is a moth of the family Gelechiidae. It is found in North Macedonia and Greece.

References

Moths described in 1999
Aroga
Moths of Europe